Bătrâneşti may refer to several villages in Romania:

 Bătrâneşti, a village in Gorbănești Commune, Botoşani County
 Bătrâneşti, a village in Icușești Commune, Neamţ County

See also 
 Bătrâna River (disambiguation)